Mount Slaughter is an ice-free peak, rising to  on a spur trending southwest from Opalchenie Peak on Vinson Plateau, Sentinel Range, in the Ellsworth Mountains, Antarctica. It is surmounting the head of Donnellan Glacier to the northwest and Gildea Glacier to the south. It was mapped by the United States Geological Survey (USGS) from surveys and U.S. Navy aerial photographs from 1957 to 1960. It was named by the Advisory Committee on Antarctic Names (US-ACAN) in 1982, after John B. Slaughter, the director of the National Science Foundation from 1980 to 1982.

Maps
 Vinson Massif.  Scale 1:250 000 topographic map.  Reston, Virginia: US Geological Survey, 1988.
 D. Gildea and C. Rada.  Vinson Massif and the Sentinel Range.  Scale 1:50 000 topographic map.  Omega Foundation, 2007.
 Antarctic Digital Database (ADD). Scale 1:250000 topographic map of Antarctica. Scientific Committee on Antarctic Research (SCAR). Since 1993, regularly updated.

Notes

References
 Mount Slaughter. SCAR Composite Antarctic Gazetteer.

Ellsworth Mountains
Mountains of Ellsworth Land